The 1990–91 Rugby Football League season was the 96th ever season of professional rugby league football in Britain. Fourteen teams competed from August, 1990 until May, 1991 for the Stones Bitter Championship, Premiership Trophy and Silk Cut Challenge Cup.

Season summary
Widnes beat Salford 24–18 to win the Lancashire County Cup, and Castleford beat Wakefield Trinity 11–8 to win the Yorkshire County Cup.

League Tables

Wigan retained their title this season, relegated were Oldham, Sheffield Eagles and Rochdale Hornets, to date this is Rochdale Hornets's last appearance in the top flight.

Championship final Standings

Second Division Final Standings

Challenge Cup

Wigan defeated St. Helens 13-8 in the Challenge Cup Final at Wembley Stadium before a crowd of 75,532. Denis Betts, Wigan's second row forward, was awarded the Lance Todd Trophy for his man-of-the-match performance.

League Cup

Premiership

Kangaroo Tour

The months of October and November also saw the appearance of the Australian team in England on their 1990 Kangaroo Tour. Other than the three test Ashes series against Great Britain (won 2–1 by Australia), The Kangaroos played and won matches against 8 Championship teams (St Helens, Wakefield Trinity, Wigan, Leeds, Warrington, Castleford, Hull and Widnes), 1 Second Division side (Halifax) and one county side (Cumbria). The team was coached by 1973 tourist and 1978 tour captain Bob Fulton and was captained by Mal Meninga who was making his third Kangaroo Tour as a player.

Penrith Panthers halfback Greg Alexander (who played most of the tour as the backup fullback to Gary Belcher), was the leading point scorer on the tour with 156 from 14 tries and 50 goals. Like Terry Lamb on the 1986 tour, Alexander was selected for every match on the tour, but he did not get off the bench in the 2nd Ashes Test at Old Trafford. Cronulla-Sutherland outside back Andrew Ettingshausen was the leading try scorer with 15 including hat-tricks against St Helens in the tour opener and Wigan a week later.

Great Britain's win in the first test at Wembley was the Lions first test win on home soil over Australia since 5 November 1978. It was the Kangaroos only loss of the tour.

References

Sources
1990–91 Rugby Football League season at wigan.rlfans.com
Great Britain Competitions 1990-1991 at hunterlink.net.au

1990 in English rugby league
1991 in English rugby league
Rugby Football League seasons